Christopher Mendiola (born 28 January 1990) is a Guamanian footballer who plays as a striker.

International goals

References 

Living people
1990 births
Guamanian footballers
Guam international footballers
Association football forwards